News Leaders Association (NLA) is a non-profit organization that focuses on training and supporting journalists. Formerly the American Society of News Editors and Associated Press Media Editors, the organizations merged in 2019 to form NLA.

History
In 1922, the American Society of Newspaper Editors was formed by top editors to elevate the professionalism and ethics of the journalism business. In 1931, managing editors felt they needed their own organization, forming the Associated Press Managing Editors. Both organizations would later change their names to reflect the changing industry: ASNE became the American Society of News Editors in 2009 and APME became the Associated Press Media Editors in 2011. In 2016, the Association of Opinion Journalists was merged with ASNE.

By 2018, the need for two separate organizations was not needed and hence they were merged to form the American Society of News Editors and the Associated Press Media Editors.” At the 2019 annual conference of APME and ASNE, the merger was approved.

Programs

Diversity
In 1978, ASNE launched an annual diversity survey of America's newsrooms. NLA continues this work, under the name "Transformative Transparency Project".

In an interview with Open the Government, NLA executive director Fran Reilly explained, "We have created an expanded program that is designed to meet the urgency of the lack of DEI in journalism—we will soon be rolling out the Transformative Transparency Project, which still uses a data collection framework to gain insights to understand the full scope of the problem, but is expanded to include tools, resources and programs to help newsrooms improve their DEI culture, and set and reach diversity goals."

Sunshine Week 

Sunshine Week is a national initiative spearheaded by the News Leaders Association to educate the public about the importance of open government and freedom of information. It was established in March 2005 and is celebrated annually during the week containing March 16, which is National Freedom of Information Day.

First Amendment 

NLA supports the First Amendment by keeping their membership informed of key legal and legislative developments and by initiating educational programs about the freedoms guaranteed by the First Amendment.

Annual Awards 

NLA recognizes excellence in journalism and leadership with their annual awards. The NLA Awards continue the long traditions of the previous ASNE and APME Awards, and are among the most prestigious in journalism.

In 2021, a new award was created to recognize an editor or team of editors who have displayed strong leadership in matching the extraordinary moment of an unprecedented year through great journalism and vital decision making on all fronts. Ron Nixon, Associated Press global investigations editor, was named the inaugural News Leader of the Year.

Leadership 
NLA promotes newsroom leadership by offering training to news leaders, such as the Emerging Leaders Institute and NewsTrain.

References 

Non-profit organizations based in Columbia, Missouri
Journalism organizations